Netrakona Stadium is a football stadium located by the Alia Madrasha, Netrakona, Bangladesh.

See also
Stadiums in Bangladesh
List of football stadiums in Bangladesh
List of cricket grounds in Bangladesh

References

Football venues in Bangladesh